In physics, a Galilean transformation is used to transform between the coordinates of two reference frames which differ only by constant relative motion within the constructs of Newtonian physics. These transformations together with spatial rotations and translations in space and time form the inhomogeneous Galilean group (assumed throughout below). Without the translations in space and time the group is the homogeneous Galilean group. The Galilean group is the group of motions of Galilean relativity acting on the four dimensions of space and time, forming the Galilean geometry. This is the passive transformation point of view. In special relativity the homogenous and inhomogenous Galilean transformations are, respectively, replaced by the Lorentz transformations and Poincaré transformations; conversely, the group contraction in the classical limit  of Poincaré transformations yields Galilean transformations.

The equations below are only physically valid in a Newtonian framework, and not applicable to coordinate systems moving relative to each other at speeds approaching the speed of light.

Galileo formulated these concepts in his description of uniform motion.
The topic was motivated by his description of the motion of a ball rolling down a ramp, by which he measured the numerical value for the acceleration of gravity near the surface of the Earth.

Translation

Although the transformations are named for Galileo, it is the absolute time and space as conceived by Isaac Newton that provides their domain of definition. In essence, the Galilean transformations embody the intuitive notion of addition and subtraction of velocities as vectors.

Note that the last equation holds for all Galilean transformations up to addition of a constant, and expresses the assumption of a universal time independent of the relative motion of different observers.

In the language of linear algebra, this transformation is considered a shear mapping, and is described with a matrix acting on a vector. With motion parallel to the x-axis, the transformation acts on only two components:

Though matrix representations are not strictly necessary for Galilean transformation, they provide the means for direct comparison to transformation methods in special relativity.

Galilean transformations
The Galilean symmetries can be uniquely written as the composition of a rotation, a translation and a uniform motion of spacetime. Let  represent a point in three-dimensional space, and  a point in one-dimensional time. A general point in spacetime is given by an ordered pair .

A uniform motion, with velocity , is given by 

where . A translation is given by

A rotation is given by
 
where  is an orthogonal transformation.

As a Lie group, the group of Galilean transformations has dimension 10.

Galilean group
Two Galilean transformations  and  compose to form a third Galilean transformation, 
. 
The set of all Galilean transformations  forms a group with composition as the group operation.

The action is given by

The composition of transformations is then accomplished through matrix multiplication. Care must be taken in the discussion whether one restricts oneself to the connected component group of the orthogonal transformations.

 has named subgroups. The identity component is denoted .

Let  represent the transformation matrix with parameters :
  anisotropic transformations.
  isochronous transformations.
  spatial Euclidean transformations.
  uniformly special transformations / homogenous transformations, isomorphic to Euclidean transformations.
  shifts of origin / translation in Newtonian spacetime.
  rotations (of reference frame) (see SO(3)), a compact group. 
  uniform frame motions / boosts.

The parameters  span ten dimensions.

The structure of  can be understood by reconstruction from subgroups. The semidirect product combination of groups is required. 
 ( is a normal subgroup)

Origin in group contraction

 is the generator of time translations (Hamiltonian),  is the generator of translations (momentum operator),  is the generator of rotationless Galilean transformations (Galileian boosts), and  stands for a generator of rotations (angular momentum operator).

This Lie Algebra is seen to be a special classical limit of the algebra of the Poincaré group, in the limit . Technically, the Galilean group is a celebrated group contraction of the Poincaré group (which, in turn, is a group contraction of the de Sitter group ).
Formally, renaming the generators of momentum and boost of the latter as in
 
, 
where  is the speed of light (or any unbounded function thereof), the commutation relations (structure constants) in the limit  take on the relations of the former. 
Generators of time translations and rotations are identified.

The infinitesimal group element is then

Central extension of the Galilean group 
The so-called Bargmann algebra is obtained by imposing , such that  lies in the center, i.e. commutes with all other operators.

In full, this algebra is given as

and finally 

where the new parameter  shows up. 
This extension and projective representations that this enables is determined by its group cohomology.

See also
Galilean invariance
Representation theory of the Galilean group
Galilei-covariant tensor formulation
Poincaré group
Lorentz group
Lagrangian and Eulerian coordinates

Notes

References

, Chapter 5, p. 83
, Chapter 38 §38.2, p. 1046,1047
, Chapter 2 §2.6, p. 42

, Chapter 9 §9.1, p. 261

Theoretical physics
Time in physics